Jeimy Astrid Prudencio Cañas (born 3 January 1995) is a Salvadoran footballer who plays as a defender for Municipal Limeño and the El Salvador women's national team.

Early life
Prudencio was born in San Miguel.

Club career
Prudencio has played for Municipal Limeño in El Salvador.

See also
List of El Salvador women's international footballers

References

1995 births
Living people
People from San Miguel, El Salvador
Salvadoran women's footballers
Women's association football defenders
El Salvador women's international footballers